The 2021 Big South women's basketball tournament was the postseason women's basketball tournament that ended the 2020–21 season of the Big South Conference. It was held March 6 through March 14, 2021, at various campus sites. High Point won the tournament, its first title since joining the conference, receiving an automatic bid to the NCAA tournament.

Sites
The first round will be played at campus sites at the home of the higher seed. The quarterfinals and semifinals will be played at #1 and #2 seeds. The championship game will be held at the home arena of the higher surviving seed.

Seeds
All of the conference teams, except for Hampton and Radford, are eligible for the tournament. Hampton cancelled their season after going 4-11, and Radford wasn't able to have the required number of players, so they will not compete in the conference tournament. The top seven teams will receive a first-round bye. This season, the team seeds were determined firstly by record (75%) within the conference and then by a "ranking index formula" (RIF) developed by the Big South for those teams affected by pauses in their schedules due to COVID-19 (25%).

Schedule

Bracket

See also
 2021 Big South Conference men's basketball tournament

References

Tournament
Big South Conference women's basketball tournament
Big South Conference women's basketball tournament